The 1989 Campeonato Brasileiro Série A was the 33rd edition of the Campeonato Brasileiro Série A. The competition was won by Vasco da Gama.

Format
First Stage The 22 clubs were divided in 2 groups of 11 teams each, playing against the other teams of their respective groups once. The 8 best placed teams of each group qualified to the Second Stage, while the 3 last placed teams of each group competed in the Relegation Tournament.

Second Stage The 16 qualified clubs were divided in two groups of 8 teams each, playing once against the other group teams. The points of this stage and of the first stage were summed. The champion of each group qualified to the final.

Relegation Tournament The 6 clubs eliminated in the First Stage played against each other twice. The 4 last placed teams were relegated to the following year's Série B.

Final It was played between the champions of the two Second Stage groups. The two clubs played a maximum of 2 matches, but the club with the best performance in the competition had the option to choose where the first match would be played, and also need only two points (one victory or two draws) to be declared as the competition champions.

Standings

First stage

Second stage

Relegation tournament

Final standings

The final

São Paulo: Gilmar; Netinho, Adílson, Ricardo Rocha and Nelsinho; Flávio, Bobô and Raí; Mário Tilico, Ney and Edivaldo (Paulo César). Head coach: Carlos Alberto Silva.

Vasco: Acácio; Luiz Carlos Winck, Quiñónez, Marco Aurélio and Mazinho; Zé do Carmo, Marco Antônio Boiadeiro and Bismarck; Sorato, Bebeto and William. Head coach: Nelsinho Rosa.

 The second leg of the final was not played as Vasco had a better season record and won the first leg.

References
Campeonato Brasileiro Série A 1989 at RSSSF

1989
1
Brazil
1989 in Brazilian football leagues